The men's decathlon event at the 2007 Pan American Games took place on July 23 and July 24, 2007. There were a total number of 12 athletes competing, from 9 nations. Jamaica's Maurice Smith took the gold with 8278 points, a new Games record, while Cuban Yordanis García became second with 8113 and Brazilian Carlos Eduardo Chinin was third with 7977.

Medalists

Schedule

July 23

July 24

Records

Results

See also
2007 World Championships in Athletics – Men's decathlon
Athletics at the 2007 Summer Universiade – Men's decathlon
Athletics at the 2008 Summer Olympics – Men's decathlon

References
Official results

Decathlon
2007